Governor Lane may refer to:

Henry Smith Lane (1811–1881), 13th Governor of Indiana
Joseph Lane (1801–1881), Acting Governor of Oregon in 1853
William Carr Lane (1789–1863), 2nd Governor of New Mexico Territory
William Preston Lane Jr. (1892–1967), 52nd Governor of Maryland